Williams station could refer to:

 Williams station (Muni Metro), a light rail station in San Francisco
 Williams Station, a Pony Express station which was the site of the Battle of Williams Station
 Williams Depot, a historic train station in Williams, Arizona
 Williams Junction station, a former train station in Williams Junction, Arizona